James Dunklin House, also known as the Williams-Watts-Todd-Dunklin House, is a historic home located in Laurens, Laurens County, South Carolina. It was built about 1812, and is a two-story, five bay, upcountry farmhouse, or I-house.  It features informally spaced columns and two pipe-stem chimneys.  An 1845 wing was removed in 1950 and converted into a six-room apartment building located behind the main house. At this time a first-floor sun porch was added to the rear of the house. Also on the property are outbuildings including a renovated slave cabin, a garage apartment, and a reconstruction of a kitchen at Colonial Williamsburg.

It was added to the National Register of Historic Places in 1974.  It is located in the Laurens Historic District.

References 

Houses on the National Register of Historic Places in South Carolina
Houses completed in 1812
Houses in Laurens County, South Carolina
National Register of Historic Places in Laurens County, South Carolina
Historic district contributing properties in South Carolina